Events in the year 1757 in India.

Events
National income - ₹9,322 million
January – Recapture of Calcutta.
 Battle of Plassey.

References

 
India
Years of the 18th century in India